The 2012–13 Welsh Premier League, known as the Corbett Sports Welsh Premier League for sponsorship reasons) was the 21st season of the Welsh Premier League, the highest football league within Wales since its establishment in 1992. The season began on 17 August 2012.

The New Saints successfully defended their title.

Teams
Following a decision by UEFA not to allow Neath F.C. a license to compete both domestically and in continental competitions, it was ruled that they would be relegated no matter where in the league they finished. Bottom club Newtown were spared relegation.

Gap Connah's Quay finished first in the 2011–12 Cymru Alliance to return to the Welsh Premier League after a two-year absence.

Stadia and locations

League table

Llanelli A.F.C.
On 22 April 2013, Llanelli A.F.C. were liquidated by HM Revenue and Customs at the High court in London with debts of £21,000; this did not affect the final league table as the club had already played all their league fixtures prior to the ruling.

Results
Teams will play each other twice on a home and away basis, before the league is split into two groups at the end of January 2013 - the top six and the bottom six.
Clubs in these groups will play each other twice again to bring the total fixture count to 32.

Matches 1–22

Matches 23–32

Top six

Bottom six

UEFA Europa League play-offs
Teams who finished in positions third through eighth at the end of the regular season will play-off to determine the second participant for the 2013–14 UEFA Europa League.

Quarter-finals

Semi-finals

Final

Top goalscorers

References

External links

Cymru Premier seasons
1